Ostap Markevych (born 4 April 1978) is a Ukrainian football manager and former football and futsal player. He is currently in charge of Polish II liga club Radunia Stężyca.

He is a son of a notable Ukrainian coach Myron Markevych.

Career
He worked as a manager for Villarreal CF. On 14 November 2022, he was announced as the new manager of Polish club Radunia Stężyca, replacing Sebastian Letniowski.

References

External links
 
 

1978 births
Living people
Ukrainian footballers
Ukrainian people of Polish descent
FC Karpaty-2 Lviv players
Ukrainian Second League players
Ukrainian football managers
Ukrainian Premier League managers
II liga managers
Ukrainian expatriate football managers
Expatriate football managers in Spain
Ukrainian expatriate sportspeople in Spain
Expatriate football managers in Poland
Ukrainian expatriate sportspeople in Poland
FC Ahrobiznes Volochysk managers
FC Chornomorets Odesa managers
FC Mariupol managers
Association footballers not categorized by position